This is the first part of the list of Nintendo Switch games.

List
There are currently  games across this page (0–A), List of Nintendo Switch games (B), List of Nintendo Switch games (C–G), List of Nintendo Switch games (H–P), and List of Nintendo Switch games (Q–Z).

References

Switch
Nintendo Switch